Microrphium is a monotypic genus of flowering plants belonging to the family Gentianaceae. The only species is Microrphium pubescens.

Its native range is Thailand to Peninsula Malaysia, Philippines.

References

Gentianaceae
Gentianaceae genera
Monotypic Gentianales genera